Výčapy-Opatovce is a village and municipality in the Nitra District in western central Slovakia, in the Nitra Region. It lies on the halfway between Topoľčany and Nitra.

History
In historical records the village was first mentioned in 1247.

Geography
The village lies at an altitude of 155 metres and covers an area of 14.189 km2. It has a population of about 2180 people.

Coat of Arms 
The Coat of Arms of village Výčapy is from 1717 and represents vineyard knife and plough on the red field. The Coat of Arms of village Opatovce comes from the year 1781 and displays a lion climbing on the coniferous tree in the green meadow.

The coat of Arms 

Both coats have been combined and recognised by heraldic committee, and authorised by municipal council. However, nobody knows who really owned the Opatovce's coat of arms.

Ethnicity
The population is about 93% Slovak and 7% Magyar.

External links
https://web.archive.org/web/20080111223415/http://www.statistics.sk/mosmis/eng/run.html 
 Výčapy Opatovce
 Výčapy Opatovce, official pages

Villages and municipalities in Nitra District